Rochus Misch (29 July 1917 – 5 September 2013) was a German Oberscharführer (sergeant) in the 1st SS Panzer Division Leibstandarte SS Adolf Hitler (LSSAH). He was badly wounded during the Polish campaign during the first month of World War II in Europe. After recovering, from 1940 to April 1945, he served in the Führerbegleitkommando (Führer Escort Command; FBK) as a bodyguard, courier, and telephone operator for German dictator Adolf Hitler.

Misch was widely reported in the media as being the last surviving former occupant of the Führerbunker when he died in September 2013.

Early life and education
Misch was born on 29 July 1917 in Alt-Schalkowitz near Oppeln (Opole) in the Province of Silesia (now Stare Siołkowice, Poland). His father, a construction worker, died of wounds sustained in World War I. His widowed mother died of pneumonia when he was two and a half, and he grew up with his grandparents. His older brother Bruno died following a swimming accident in 1922.

Over the objections of the school director, his grandfather took him out of school after eight years as he thought Rochus needed to learn a trade. After several years, Misch moved to Hoyerswerda and became an apprentice with the firm of Schmüller & Model. There he trained as a painter. In 1935, after working as a journeyman painter, Misch attended the Masters' School for Fine Arts in Cologne. After six months, he returned to Hoyerswerda to continue his training. Misch met Gerda, his wife-to-be, in July 1938. They later married on New Year's Eve, 1942. They had a daughter, Brigitta Jacob-Engelken who after the end of World War II, supported Jewish causes.

Military service
In 1937, Misch received a call-up notice for military service. In Offenberg, he joined the SS-Verfügungstruppe (SS-VT), the predecessor to the Waffen-SS, instead of the German Army as the SS-VT did not require Reichsarbeitsdienst (National Labour Service) time. Along with eleven others, he was selected for Hitler's personal bodyguard unit, the Leibstandarte SS Adolf Hitler (LSSAH). In August 1939, he was promoted to the rank of SS-Rottenführer.

World War II
For the invasion of Poland in September 1939, his regiment was attached to the XIII Army Corps, a part of the 8th Army. Near Warsaw on 24 September, he was one of four men selected by his company commander, then SS-Hauptsturmführer Wilhelm Mohnke to negotiate the surrender of Polish troops during the Battle of Modlin. He was picked because of his ability, although very limited, to speak Polish. After the negotiations failed, the Germans headed back to their lines. When they were about 80 metres from the fort, firing began. Several rounds struck Misch, who fell down and lost consciousness. Some German soldiers carried him to an aid station. Later, he was transferred to two different hospitals. Thereafter, he spent six weeks at a convalescent home. For his actions, Misch was awarded the Iron Cross, Second Class. As Misch was the last living member of his Lower Silesian family, Mohnke recommended him for the SS-Begleitkommando des Führers (Führer Escort Command; FBK). This was made up of SS members, including men from the LSSAH, who were not serving on the front lines.

Misch was transferred to the FBK in early May 1940. As a junior member of Hitler's permanent bodyguard, Misch travelled with Hitler throughout the war. When not serving as bodyguards, Misch and the others in the unit served as telephone operators, couriers, orderlies, valets, and waiters. When on duty, the FBK members were the only armed men Hitler allowed to be near him. They never had to surrender their weapon and were never searched when they were with Hitler. It did cause Misch some concern that they were armed only with Walther PPK 7.65 pistols.

On 16 January 1945, following the Wehrmacht's defeat in the Battle of the Bulge, Misch and the rest of Hitler's personal staff moved into the Führerbunker and Vorbunker under the Reich Chancellery garden in Berlin. His FBK commanding officer, Franz Schädle, appointed Misch to be the bunker telephone operator. Misch handled all of the direct communication from the bunker. He did not leave it for any significant period of time until the war ended in May 1945. On 22 April 1945, Schädle called him on the phone and told him there was a place reserved for his wife and young daughter on one of the last planes out of Berlin. Misch was temporarily released from duty and drove to pick up his family to take them to the aircraft. However, his wife refused to take their daughter and leave him and her parents in Berlin. Upon returning to the Reich Chancellery, Misch learned Hitler was releasing most of the remaining staff to leave Berlin. By that date, as the Red Army was entering Berlin, propaganda minister Joseph Goebbels and his wife Magda brought their six young children to stay in the Vorbunker. Joseph Goebbels moved into the room next to Misch's telephone exchange in the lower level of the Führerbunker. The Goebbels children would play in the corridor around Misch's post.

That afternoon, Hitler and Eva Braun committed suicide less than 40 hours after they were married. Misch witnessed the discovery of the bodies of Hitler and Braun. He followed Otto Günsche and Hitler's chief valet Heinz Linge to the door of Hitler's private room. After the door was opened, Misch only took a quick "glance". He saw Eva, with her legs drawn up, to Hitler's left on the sofa. Her eyes were open and she was dead. Hitler was also dead. He was either sitting on the sofa or in the armchair by it; his head "had fallen forward slightly". Misch started to leave to report the events to Schädle, then stopped and returned to the door of Hitler's study. Misch then observed Hitler's corpse had been removed from inside the study and wrapped in a blanket. Several men then picked it up and carried it past him. Misch left and reported the events to Schädle, who instructed him to return to his duty station. After returning to the telephone exchange, Misch later recalled Unterscharführer Retzbach proclaiming "So they're burning the boss now!" Retzbach asked Misch if he was going upstairs to watch the events, but Misch declined to go. Thereafter, Günsche came down and told Misch that the corpses of Hitler and Braun had been burned in the garden of the Reich Chancellery.

Misch was present in the bunker complex when Magda Goebbels poisoned her six children and then committed suicide with her husband Joseph on 1 May 1945. According to Misch, this act by the Goebbels' of murdering their children was most unsettling. Years later he stated that event was the "most dreadful thing" he experienced in the bunker.

Prior to his suicide, Joseph Goebbels finally released Misch from further service; he was free to leave. Misch and mechanic Johannes Hentschel were two of the last people remaining in the bunker. They exchanged letters to their wives in case anything happened to either of them. Misch then went upstairs through the cellars of the Reich Chancellery to where Schädle had his office to report one last time. According to Hentschel, by that time Schädle's shrapnel leg wound had turned gangrenous. Misch told Schädle that Goebbels had released him. Schädle told Misch what route he should take in order to avoid the Soviet encirclement of the Berlin area. Thereafter, Schädle shot himself. Misch fled the bunker in the early morning of 2 May, only hours before the Red Army seized it. He met up with some other soldiers and travelled north through the U-Bahn tunnels. Shortly thereafter, they were taken prisoner by Red Army soldiers. Misch was brought to Lubyanka Prison in Moscow, where he was tortured by Soviet NKVD officers in an attempt to extract information regarding Hitler's last days. Soviet leader Joseph Stalin was extremely interested in learning of Hitler's fate and theories about possible escape. Misch spent eight years in Soviet forced labour camps.

Later life and death
After his release from captivity, Misch returned to what was then West Berlin on 31 December 1953. At the time, Misch's wife Gerda worked as a teacher in Neukölln. Misch struggled for several years with what to do with his life after captivity. He was offered various odd jobs, among others as a porter in a hospital and as a driver. Most of these job offers were through his wartime contacts, and required moving away from Berlin, which his wife refused to do. He finally obtained a loan backed by wealthy German philanthropists to buy out a painting and interior decorating shop from a retiree in Berlin. He ran this modest business successfully, and during the early Allied occupation of Berlin also became involved in the making of peanut butter for US soldiers. The business had been started by Misch's old friend, Adolf Kleinholdermann. This sideline business became so successful Misch considered leaving his shop. His wife Gerda convinced him to remain in the painting and interior decorating business. In 1975, Gerda was elected to the parliament of West Berlin in which she served for several years. Years later, Gerda developed Alzheimer's and died in 1998. Misch continued to manage his shop until his retirement at age 68 in 1985.

Misch was loyal to Hitler to the end of his life, stating in Nazi apologia, "He was no brute. He was no monster. He was no superman", "...very normal. Not like what is written", and "[h]e was a wonderful boss". Misch's daughter, Brigitta, learned through her maternal grandmother Gerda was of Jewish descent. However, Gerda never mentioned it and her father refused to acknowledge it. Brigitta became an architect and has supported Jewish causes. Brigitta stated that she was disappointed by her father's lack of remorse after the war.

After the release of the 2004 German film Downfall (Der Untergang) in France, French journalist Nicolas Bourcier interviewed Misch on a number of occasions in 2005. The resulting biography was published in French as J'étais garde du corps d'Hitler 1940–1945 ("I was Hitler's bodyguard 1940–1945") in March 2006, . Translations were released in South America, Japan, Spain, Poland, Turkey, and Germany in 2006 and 2007. Misch served as consultant to writer Christopher McQuarrie on the 2008 film Valkyrie, a Hollywood depiction of the 20 July plot.

In a 2005 interview, Misch called Downfall "Americanized" while comparing what happened in the film to what happened in real life, stating that although it portrayed the important facts accurately, it exaggerated other details for dramatic effect, such as the film's characters screaming and shouting when in his recollection most people in the bunker spoke quietly. In the interview he also expressed some skepticism regarding Hitler's role in Nazi atrocities, stating that "Neo-Nazis" did not exist but were rather just patriotic people who cared about their countries' well-being, and that the US invaded Iraq in 2003 to enrich Israel.

After listening to an 11-minute recording of Hitler in private conversation with Finnish Field Marshal Carl Gustaf Emil Mannerheim, Misch opined: "He is speaking normally, but I'm having problems with the tone; the intonation isn't quite right. Sometimes it seems okay, but at other points not. I have the feeling it's someone mimicking Hitler. It really sounds as if someone is mimicking him."

With the deaths of Bernd von Freytag-Loringhoven on 27 February 2007, Armin Lehmann on 10 October 2008, and Siegfried Knappe on 1 December 2008, Misch was said to be the last survivor of the Führerbunker. His memoir in German, Der letzte Zeuge ("The Last Witness"), was published in 2008. The English edition was published in 2014 with an introduction by historian Roger Moorhouse. Misch lived in Berlin in the same house he moved into when he was released by the Soviets. The house is in the district of Rudow in South Berlin. Misch regularly received visitors who wished to speak to or interview him. Misch died in Berlin on 5 September 2013 at the age of 96.

Books

 J'étais garde du corps d'Hitler 1940–1945 (I was Hitler's bodyguard 1940–1945), with Nicolas Bourcier. Le Cherche Midi 2006, .
 Rochus Misch: Der letzte Zeuge. Ich war Hitlers Telefonist, Kurier und Leibwächter. Mit einem Vorwort von Ralph Giordano. 11. Auflage, Piper-Verlag 2013, .
 Hitler's Last Witness: The Memoirs of Hitler's Bodyguard. Frontline Books 2014, .

See also 
 The Bunker
 Downfall (Der Untergang)
 Die Letzte Schlacht'' (The Last Battle)

References

Notes

Bibliography

External links

 Part 2 – Eva Braun saß tot in der Couchecke
 interview with Rochus Misch

1917 births
2013 deaths
SS non-commissioned officers
German prisoners of war in World War II held by the Soviet Union
People from Opole
People from the Province of Silesia
Recipients of the Iron Cross (1939), 2nd class
Personal staff of Adolf Hitler
Waffen-SS personnel
Shooting survivors